The Human Bomb is a fictional superhero published by DC Comics. He first appeared in Police Comics #1 (August 1941), and was created by writer and artist Paul Gustavson.

Publication history
The Human Bomb was first published by Quality Comics in the 1940s, and decades later by DC Comics after it acquired Quality's characters. Police Comics #1 also featured the first appearances of Plastic Man and the Phantom Lady, among others.

Fictional character biography

Roy Lincoln

Quality Comics
Roy Lincoln is originally a scientist working with his father on a special explosive chemical called "27-QRX". When Nazi spies invade his lab and kill his father, he ingests the chemical to prevent it from falling into their hands. As a result, Lincoln gains the ability to cause explosions in any object he came into contact with, particularly through his hands; the only way to control it is to always wear special asbestos gloves (which were subsequently retconned into "Fibro-wax" gloves after the human health hazards of asbestos were discovered). Donning a containment suit to prevent any accidental explosions, Lincoln becomes the "Human Bomb", removing his gloves only to expose his explosive powers against Nazi and Japanese enemies, as well as ordinary criminals. He also fights the invisible Mr. Chameleon, the pied piper of destruction Herman Stingmayer, and Yarboe, who has the Human Bomb's explosive ability.

He later gains enough control over his powers to be able to remove the containment suit, though the gloves are always necessary.

In 1943, the Bomb briefly has a comedy sidekick, Hustace Throckmorton, who has similar powers (thanks to a blood transfusion from Lincoln) but only on the soles of his feet. Following this, Lincoln shares his formula with three friends — Swordo the Sword Swallower, Montague T. "Curly" McGurx and Red Rogers. They become "the Bombadiers", and work behind enemy lines for a few issues targeting Japanese and German soldiers. The Human Bomb drops his new team soon after and returned to the States alone.

A Human Bomb feature continued in Police Comics through issue #58, published in September 1946.

DC Comics
After Quality Comics went out of business in 1956, DC Comics acquired the rights to the Human Bomb as well as the other Quality Comics properties. The Human Bomb remained unpublished until he and several other former Quality properties were re-launched in Justice League of America #107 (October 1973) as the Freedom Fighters. As was done with many other characters DC had acquired from other publishers or that were holdovers from Golden Age titles, the Freedom Fighters were located on a parallel world, in this case called "Earth-X" on which Nazi Germany won World War II. The team were featured in their own series for fifteen issues (1976-1978), in which the team temporarily left Earth-X for "Earth-1" (where most DC titles were set). The Human Bomb was then an occasional guest star of All-Star Squadron, a superhero team title that was set on "Earth-2", the locale for DC's WWII-era superheroes, at a time prior to when he and the other Freedom Fighters were supposed to have left for Earth-X.

The character then appeared with the rest of DC's entire cast of superheroes in Crisis on Infinite Earths, a story that was intended to eliminate the similarly confusing histories that DC had attached to its characters by retroactively merging the various parallel worlds into one. This erased the Human Bomb's Earth-X days, and merged the character's All-Star Squadron and Freedom Fighter histories so that the Freedom Fighters were merely a splinter group of the Squadron.

Lincoln was shown as retired and frail in several issues of Damage in the mid-1990s, but he then subsequently appears as the Human Bomb in several issues of JSA in 2003. His death was depicted in Infinite Crisis #1 (October 2005) at the hands of Bizarro, when the Freedom Fighters fought with the Secret Society of Super Villains. After the Human Bomb killed Doctor Polaris in a fit of rage, Bizarro attacked the Bomb, hammering his face to produce more colorful explosions. Lincoln's body was pulped by the brutal beating received, his explosive nature not harming the impervious Bizarro. The explosions stopped even though Bizarro continued punching, indicating that the power ended at the instant of death.

His body was strung up on the Washington Monument, next to his deceased comrades, Phantom Lady and Black Condor. Both had perished in battle with the Society.

Roy reanimated as a Black Lantern during the Blackest Night crossover. He and his fellow Black Lantern Freedom Fighters attack the JSA. They mostly target their former teammate Damage, admonishing him for surviving the Society's attack where they didn't.

In the pages of Dark Nights: Death Metal, Roy is revealed to be entombed in the Valhalla Cemetery. Batman later revived him with a Black Lantern Ring.

A panel in "The New Golden Age" one-shot revealed that Human Bomb had a sidekick named Cherry Bomb who took a recreated version of the formula that gave Human Bomb his powers. Due to it growing dangerous, Human Bomb had Cherry Bomb continue wearing her special containment costume to avoid an unexpected explosion. It was stated that Human Bomb worked on finding a way to cure Cherry Bomb until the day she mysteriously vanished.

Andy Franklin

Crisis Aftermath: The Battle For Blüdhaven #1, introduces a character named Andy Franklin, a former scientist caught in the blast that destroyed Blüdhaven who had been held as an experiment in the secret internment camps within the shattered city. He is referred to in the story as "some kind of human bomb". With issue #2, he becomes the new Human Bomb, first displaying his powers in Blüdhaven #3 when he plucks off a piece of his fingernail, flicks it, and kills an oncoming troop of Atomic Knights in the resulting explosion. He is a lifelong fan of Green Lantern, even refusing to attack him during the Battle For Blüdhaven series. In Uncle Sam & the Freedom Fighters #2, Uncle Sam remarks that a drop of Franklin's sweat would be sufficient to level Manhattan. Andy is highly emotional, and is hurt deeply because his teammates refer to him as a freak because of his destructive powers. He has a higher sense of morality than his teammates, but has shown that he will use lethal force when he sees his friends hurt. Andy seems to be more powerful than his predecessors, as seen in Uncle Sam and The Freedom Fighters #2, when he created a concussive blast just by slamming his gloved fists together. Andy's condition requires him to take special medication developed by SHADE, otherwise he will involuntarily explode.

Michael Taylor
In 2011, "The New 52" rebooted the DC universe. A 4-issue mini-series helmed by Battle for Bludhaven creators Justin Gray and Jimmy Palmiotti introduces a new Human Bomb. Michael Taylor is an ex-Marine and veteran who uncovers a plot to use "human bombs" to destroy the United States.

Powers and abilities
Lincoln could generate a biochemical explosion with just a touch. If he increased the kinetic force by hitting the object harder, the explosive force was also increased. Lincoln was also a fine hand-to-hand combatant and a talented chemist. The changes to his body chemistry seemed to have prolonged his life. Lincoln wore from head to toe, a containment suit made of "Fibro wax", which inhibited his biochemical explosive reaction. When he wanted to use his powers, he simply removed his gloves.

Other versions
 In Mark Waid and Alex Ross' Kingdom Come series, the Human Bomb is briefly seen in issue #2 in the metahuman bar where Superman was recruiting for the Justice League. This is a younger, amoral Human Bomb. The original Human Bomb is a member of the Justice League in the Kingdom Come series.
 In the final issue of 52, a new Multiverse is revealed, originally consisting of 52 identical realities. Among the parallel realities shown is one designated "Earth-10". As a result of Mister Mind "eating" aspects of this reality, it takes on visual aspects similar to the pre-Crisis Earth-X, including the Quality characters. The names of the characters and the team are not mentioned in the panel in which they appear, but a character visually similar to the Roy Lincoln Human Bomb appears. Based on comments by Grant Morrison, this alternate universe is not the pre-Crisis Earth-X.
 The Human Bomb is a central character in Multiversity: Mastermen, set on Earth-10. Still a member of the Freedom Fighters, he undertakes a solo mission to sabotage and deorbit the New Reichsmen (Nazi Justice League) satellite the Eagles Eyrie, and effectively does so, killing millions in the Nazi-dominated American city of Metropolis as it impacts there. This version of the Human Bomb is also invulnerable.
 New Super-Man features a character named Human Firecracker (an analog of Human Bomb).

In other media
 The Roy Lincoln incarnation of Human Bomb appears in the Batman: The Brave and the Bold episode "Cry Freedom Fighters!"
 The Human Bomb appears in issue #17 of the Justice League Unlimited tie-in comic book.

References

DC Comics metahumans
DC Comics scientists
DC Comics superheroes
Fictional chemists
Golden Age superheroes
Quality Comics superheroes
Comics characters introduced in 1941
Comics characters introduced in 2006